The 2013 Hønefoss BK season was Hønefoss' second consecutive season in the Tippeligaen and their third season in the top flight of Norwegian football. Hønefoss finished bottom of the league, and therefore were relegated to the Adeccoligaen, whilst they reached the Third Round of the Cup losing to Alta of the 2. divisjon.

Squad

On Loan

Transfers

Winter

In:

Out:

Summer

In:

 

Out:

Competitions

Tippeligaen

Results summary

Results by round

Matches

Table

Norwegian Cup

Squad statistics

Appearances and goals

|-
|colspan="14"|Players away from Hønefoss on loan:

|-
|colspan="14"|Players who appeared for Hønefoss no longer at the club:

|}

Goal scorers

Disciplinary record

References

Hønefoss BK seasons
Honefoss